Nikos Sampson (born Nikos Georgiadis, ; 16 December 1935 – 9 May 2001) was the de facto president of Cyprus who succeeded Archbishop Makarios, appointed as the president of Cyprus by the Greek military leaders of the coup d'état against Makarios, on July 15, 1974. Sampson was a journalist and a member of EOKA, which rose against the British colonial administration, seeking Enosis (Union) of the island of Cyprus with Greece. He was eventually arrested and sentenced to death, but was imprisoned in Britain after the sentence was commuted, returning after Cyprus gained independence.

Upon his arrival within the newly formed Republic of Cyprus, he entered politics, becoming a member of Parliament. Following the coup of 1974 by the Greek Junta, he was appointed president by the leaders of the coup Kombokis and Georgitsis as a solution of necessity because nobody else accepted, and remained in the position for eight days. Following the Turkish invasion of Cyprus on 20 July he resigned. He was later sentenced to twenty years in prison for abuse of power, the only person convicted vis-à-vis the coup, maintaining there had been a setup and cover up.

According to Cyprus-based Polish-American journalist, Andrew Borowiec, several members of the US embassy in Nicosia had been on friendly terms with Sampson and he had even toured the US at the US government's invitation. Three years into his sentence, he was allowed to go to France on medical grounds, and subsequently settled in France. He returned to Cyprus in 1990 to resume his sentence, and was pardoned for the remainder of his sentence in 1993. Following his release, he went into the newspaper publishing business. He died of cancer in 2001.

Early life
Sampson was born in the Cypriot port city of Famagusta to Sampson Georgiadis and Theano Liasidou. During his teenage years, he was a footballer, playing as a right back in the Anorthosis Famagusta second team. He began his working life at a Cyprus newspaper, The Cyprus Times, which was owned and edited by Charles Foley. His original name was Nikos Georgiadis, but he adopted his father's forename as his surname.

EOKA activities

During the Cyprus Emergency, in which the Greek-Cypriot organization EOKA waged a guerilla campaign against British colonial rule in Cyprus from 1955 to 1959, Sampson joined EOKA and adopted the nom de guerre Atrotos, or "Invulnerable". Sampson joined EOKA and formed part of an execution team under the direct orders of General Georgios Grivas ("Digenis"), leader of EOKA. Another member of this team was Neoptolemos Georgiou who was later arrested for various activities whilst being a member of EOKA-B. Sampson and Georgiou participated in a number of murders carried out along Ledra Street in Nicosia, which was nicknamed  "Murder Mile", and shot dead numerous British servicemen, police officers, and civilians. He was involved in at least 15 killings. According to British sources, the actual number was much higher. Among his victims were three police sergeants, and in May 1957, Sampson was tried for one of their murders. He confessed, but was acquitted on the grounds that his confession may have been coerced by torture.

At the time, Sampson was working as a journalist, and he would often photograph the bodies of his victims after killing them, then send the photographs to The Cyprus Times newspaper to be published. The police became suspicious about how Sampson was always the first reporter to arrive at the murder scene and he was arrested. Only a month after his acquittal, he was given away by informants and arrested in the village of Dhali. He was convicted of weapons possession which, under the emergency regulations of the moment, carried a death sentence. The death sentence was subsequently commuted to life imprisonment and Sampson was flown to the United Kingdom to serve it. A year and a half later, under a general amnesty as part of the 1959 Zürich and London Agreement, he was released but he remained in exile in Greece until Cyprus gained formal independence in August 1960. He returned to Nicosia shortly after Independence Day.

The 1960s
Sampson returned to newspaper publishing. In 1960, he set up the newspaper Makhi, meaning battle, or struggle. In a series of newspaper articles published in 1961, Sampson discussed aspects of his participation in the EOKA campaign against British colonial rule in Cyprus, including skirmishes he participated in against the British colonial police. According to The Daily Telegraph, as a journalist, he flew to Algeria to interview Ben Bella and to Washington, D.C. to talk to U.S. President John F. Kennedy.

On 14 May 1961, he was arrested, along with another man, a garage mechanic who was also a former EOKA member, in connection with the murder of a British architect, Peter Gray, who had been only three weeks in the country and had been shot and killed in Kyrenia in his car. Sampson was charged with the murder, but released three days later. Makhi later printed a claim that Gray was working for the British Secret Intelligence Service. His murder remained unsolved.

Following an explosion to the statue of EOKA hero Markos Drakos in Nicosia, Sampson actively participated in clashes between the Greek and Turkish communities in December 1963.  On the morning of 24 December, the clashes in Nicosia spread and fighting continued into the subsequent year. Sampson led armed groups in fierce battles between Greek Cypriot and Turkish Cypriot irregulars. Following the fight in Omorphita, Nikos Sampson was nicknamed by the Turkish Cypriots as the "Butcher of Omorphita".

The 1974 coup

In 1969 Sampson founded the Progressive Party, which later merged into the Progressive Front. Sampson was elected to the House of Representatives in the 1970 elections. In 1971, EOKA head George Grivas returned to Cyprus and gave the campaign for enosis further momentum, forming EOKA B whose goal was enosis. Following the death of Grivas in January 1974, the Greek military junta of 1967-1974 gave active support to EOKA-B. Nikos Sampson maintained a strongly nationalist, pro-Greek position throughout these years.
On 15 July 1974, Makarios was deposed by a military coup which was led by Greek officers of the Cyprus National Guard.

Interim President of Cyprus

The Greek military junta installed Sampson as president, as a result of a decision of Colonel Constantinos Kombokis, Deputy leader of the coup, when the President of the Supreme Court could not be found and an ex Makarios minister Zenon Severis refused to take over as president. Sampson's appointment was an on-the-spot decision to avoid a power vacuum.
The second Junta of Greece fell on 24 July 1974, only eight days after Sampson had been appointed. Sampson was forced to resign. The Greek Cypriot government was restored under Glafkos Clerides. When Sampson resigned on Tuesday July 23, 1974 Turkey was in control of 3% of the territory of Cyprus and the Turkish Cypriot enclaves (around 4-5% of the territory) had almost all fallen in the hands of Greek-Cypriots (H Tragiki Anametrisi kai i Prodosia tis Kyprou-Marios Adamides – 2012).

Imprisonment and later years
The invasion lost Sampson much of his popular appeal. He claimed not to have anticipated the impending coup that had installed him, adding that, after military officers had insisted, he "saw the possibility of civil war and accepted" to prevent the clashes.
Nonetheless, Sampson was prosecuted and sentenced to 20 years in prison for abuse of power in 1976.

In 1979, only three years into his prison sentence, he was allowed to go to France on medical grounds. Living in Neuilly, and then in Fourqueux, he was supported by funds of friends. He spent much of his time between Paris and Marseilles before returning to Cyprus in June 1990 to complete his sentence.

Following his release from Nicosia Central Prison in 1992, he went back to the newspaper publishing business. He died of cancer on 9 May 2001 in Nicosia at the age of 65.

He is survived by his wife Vera and two children, one of whom is a lawyer and the other a journalist. His son Sotiris Sampson was elected member of the House of Representatives of Cyprus for three terms in a row in Famagusta District.

Legacy
The right wing community refers to Sampson as a hero of the EOKA struggle, whereas the left wing community, although it acknowledges his contribution to the EOKA struggle, sees him as a traitor to the Republic of Cyprus for his involvement in the coup and complicity in the murder of numerous liberal and left-wing Greek Cypriots.

Bibliography
 [ Cyprus], Paul D. Hellander, 2003 
 [ The Cyprus Question and the Turkish Position in International Law],  Zaim M. Necatigil, 1993 
 Η Μεγάλη Ιδέα της Μικρής Χούντας, Makarios Droushiotis, 2010
 H Αλήθεια, Bonanos, 1986
 Απο την Ζυριχη στον Αττιλα, Spyros Papageorgiou, 1980
 Η Κατάθεση Μου, Glafcos Clerides, 1991
 Πόρισμα της Ελληνικής Βουλής για τον Φακελο της Κυπρου, 1988
 Πόρισμα Κυπριακής Βουλής για τον Φακελο της Κυπρου, 2011
 Φάκελος Κύπρου: Τα απόρρητα Ντοκουμέντα, Eleftherotypia, 2010
 30 Hot Days, by Mehmet Ali Birand
 1974 – To Agnosto Paraskinio tis Tourkikis Eisvolis – Makarios Droushiotis
 Years of Renewal-Kissinger Henry
 Makarios Speech to the Security Council of the UN – 19 July 1974 – H Tragiki Anametrisi kai i Prodosia tis Kyprou – Marios Adamides – 2012
 Secret Minutes of the Conversation of Makarios with the Prime Minister of the U.K Wilson – 17 July 1974 – H Tragiki Anametrisi kai i Prodosia tis Kyprou-Marios Adamides – 2012
 Secret Minutes of the Conversation of the Prime Minister of Turkey Ecevit with the Prime Minister of the U.K Wilson – 17 July 1974 – H Tragiki Anametrisi kai i Prodosia tis Kyprou – Marios Adamides – 2012
The Tragic Duel and the Betrayal of Cyprus-H Tragiki Anametrisi kai i Prodosia tis Kyprou-Marios Adamides-2011-Library of Congress, Washington- Shelf Location FLS2015 186850 CALL NUMBER DS54.9 .A345 2011 OVERFLOWJ34 Request in Jefferson or Adams Building Reading Rooms (FLS2)

References

1935 births
2001 deaths
20th-century presidents of Cyprus
Leaders of political parties in Cyprus
Leaders who took power by coup
Newspaper publishers (people)
Cypriot journalists
Cypriot refugees
Cypriot people of the EOKA
People from Famagusta
Cypriot prisoners sentenced to death
Prisoners and detainees of Cyprus
Cypriot footballers
Anorthosis Famagusta F.C. players
Deaths from cancer in Cyprus
Association football fullbacks
20th-century journalists